Gilson Rosa de Jesus (born 29 November 1979) is a Brazilian footballer.

Career

Gilson played in only three clubs, and settled more time in Brasiliense.

Throughout his career Gilson won four national championships titles between them the second and third division.

Honours

Campeonato Brasileiro (2ª divisão): 2002
Campeonato Brasiliense: 2004, 2005, 2006
Campeonato Goiano: 2007
Campeonato Brasileiro (3ª divisão): 2008

Contract
 Atlético Goianiense.

References

External links
zerozerofootball.com 

1979 births
Living people
Brazilian footballers
Atlético Clube Goianiense players
ABC Futebol Clube players
Campeonato Brasileiro Série A players
Association football defenders
Footballers from Brasília